The list of ship launches in 1766 includes a chronological list of some ships launched in 1766.


References

1766
Ship launches